Ōhara Station is the name of multiple train stations in Japan.

 Ōhara Station (Chiba) - (大原駅) in Chiba Prefecture
 Ōhara Station (Okayama) - (大原駅) in Okayama Prefecture